Madhupur tract is a large upland area  of 4,244 km2 in north central part of Bangladesh, stretching from east of Jamalpur in the north, to Fatullah and Narayanganj, in the south. The tract is mostly one large tract, unlike the Barind Tract. It is approximately one to ten metres above the nearby floodplains.

The tract is considered as an area of jungle-covered of old alluvium. It is  an elevated plateau, with hillocks  of varying heights, ranging from 30 to 60 feet. There are also cultivated valleys.
Geographical regions

See also
 Bhawal National Park
 Geology of Bangladesh
 Geography of Bangladesh

Footnotes

External links
 

Geography of Bangladesh